Louis Dubois may refer to:
Louis DuBois (Huguenot) (died 1696), Huguenot colonist in New Netherland 
Louis Dubois (painter) (1830–1880), Belgian painter
Louis Dubois (politician) (1859–1946), French politician
Louis-Ernest Dubois (1856–1929), Roman Catholic cardinal and Archbishop of Paris
Louis Victor Dubois (1837–1914), French politician
Lewis DuBois (1744–1824), American Revolutionary War commander